The Quebec Athletics/Alouettes/Braves were a Minor League Baseball team that operated from 1939–1955. Operating in Quebec City, the team played in the Quebec Provincial League in 1939 and 1940 and the Canadian–American League from 1941–1942 and 1946–1950. They were affiliated with the Brooklyn Dodgers during the 1941 season, the Chicago Cubs in 1946, New York Giants in 1948 and the Boston Braves/Milwaukee Braves from 1951–1955. The 1950 Braves were recognized as one of the 100 greatest minor league teams of all time.

References

External links
Baseball Reference
 Tour of the teams ballpark

Defunct minor league baseball teams
Defunct baseball teams in Canada
Baseball in Quebec City
Baseball teams in Quebec
Sports teams in Quebec City
Brooklyn Dodgers minor league affiliates
Chicago Cubs minor league affiliates
New York Giants minor league affiliates
Boston Braves minor league affiliates
Milwaukee Braves minor league affiliates
Baseball teams established in 1939
Baseball teams disestablished in 1955
Ontario–Quebec–Vermont League teams